The Township of Ashfield–Colborne–Wawanosh is a municipality in Huron County, Ontario, Canada. It was formed as an amalgamation of the former Ashfield, Colborne and West Wawanosh townships in 2001, in an Ontario-wide local government restructuring imposed by the government of that time. The three former townships now comprise the wards of the amalgamated municipality.
Mayor of Dungannon Robert Brindley Jr.

Geography

Ashfield–Colborne–Wawanosh is located in the northwest corner of Huron County. Lake Huron is the western boundary and the Township has  of Lake Huron shoreline. Its southern boundary is the Maitland River between Goderich and Auburn. The eastern border is Huron Road 22, from Auburn north to Huron Road 86 near Whitechurch. Huron Road 86 is generally the northern border of Ashfield–Colborne–Wawanosh except for the Lucknow community limits which are in Bruce County.

Communities
The township encompasses the communities of Amberley, Auburn, Benmiller, Carlow, Dungannon, Kingsbridge, Kintail, Nile, Port Albert, St. Augustine, St. Helens and Saltford.

Military history 

During World War II the Royal Air Force  operated No. 31 Air Navigation School as part of the British Commonwealth Air Training Plan on Highway 21 near Port Albert.  The school relocated from Great Britain to RCAF Station Port Albert on 18 November 1940 and closed on 17 February 1945.

The  site was later used as a race car track and in 2013 is farmland.

There is a memorial cairn and plaque at 83700 Highway 21. The airfield was located across the road from the cairn at 
. The Huron Country Museum in nearby Goderich, Ontario has an extensive collection of artifacts from No. 31 ANS.

Transportation
Highway 21 travels through the western portion of the township.

Huron Road 1 proceeds north from Benmiller through Carlow then Lucknow.

Goderich Municipal Airport is also located in the Township of ACW.

Huron Road 25 proceeds east from Highway 21 to the edge of ACW at Huron Road 22 in Auburn.

Facilities
Municipal offices are located west of Carlow (82133 Council Line), north-east of Goderich at the south end of the township.

Demographics 

See also
 List of municipalities in Ontario
List of townships in Ontario

References

External links 

Township municipalities in Ontario
Lower-tier municipalities in Ontario
Municipalities in Huron County, Ontario
BCATP
Military history of Canada during World War II